Manon Lescaut is a 1914 American silent drama film directed by Herbert Hall Winslow and starring Lina Cavalieri, Lucien Muratore and Dorothy Arthur. It is an adaptation of the Abbé Prévost's novel Manon Lescaut (1731). It is now considered a lost film.

Cast
 Lina Cavalieri as Manon Lescaut  
 Lucien Muratore as Chevalier des Grieux  
 Dorothy Arthur as Fifine  
 William L. Abingdon as Baron de Bretigny  
 Charles Hammond as Abbe Tiberge  
 Frank H. Westerton as Lescaut  
 Henry Weaver as Rochfort  
 Frank Hardy as Synnelet  
 Herbert Hall Winslow as Edouarde  
 Walter Cecil as Governor of St. Lazare

See also
Manon Lescaut (1926)
When a Man Loves (1927)
Manon Lescaut (1940)

References

Bibliography
 Paul Fryer, Olga Usova. Lina Cavalieri: The Life of Opera's Greatest Beauty, 1874-1944. McFarland, 2003.

External links
 

1914 films
1914 lost films
1910s historical drama films
American silent feature films
American historical drama films
Lost drama films
Films set in France
Films based on French novels
Films based on works by Antoine François Prévost
Films set in the 18th century
Lost American films
American black-and-white films
1914 drama films
1910s English-language films
1910s American films
Silent American drama films